Tianqiao Subdistrict, Bengbu  is a township-level division situated in Bengbu, Anhui, China.

See also
List of township-level divisions of Anhui

References

Township-level divisions of Anhui